Paul Joseph Stevenson OAM (born 12 September 1955) is an Australian psychologist.

Professional career – disaster intervention and support
Stevenson has wide experience in general and trauma counselling and is widely recognised as an international trauma psychologist. His experience includes on-site involvement with the Moura Mine Disaster in 1994, the Port Arthur Massacre (Australia) in 1996, the Thredbo landslide in 1997, the Bali bombings in 2002 and 2005, the Marriott bombing (Jakarta) in 2003, the 2004 Australian Embassy bombing in Jakarta, the Indian Ocean tsunami recovery in 2004–05, the Victorian Bushfires in 2009, He received a Medal of the Order of Australia for his work following the 2002 Bali Bombings. the 2010–2011 Queensland floods, Cyclone Oswald, and support for the families of those lost in Malaysia Airlines Flight 370.

Professional career – refugee support and advocacy
Stevenson has worked as a psychologist at the Manus Regional Processing Centre and the Nauru Detention Centre, providing support to both staff and detainees.  He maintains that the levels of psychological trauma at these Centres are the worst he has ever seen, and that Australia has an ethical responsibility to ensure these Centres are closed down.  As a result of speaking out, Stevenson had his contract to work on Nauru summarily terminated by PsyCare.

Professional views
Stevenson suggests that the traditional method of Critical Incident Stress Debriefing needs to be used with caution, and suggests that an eclectic and humanitarian approach is necessary for stress and trauma response. Stevenson believes that to some extent psychological trauma may be a natural reaction to extreme circumstances, and we need to de-stigmatize this, as indeed we need to de-stigmatize mental illness.

Politics
Stevenson was an Independent Candidate for the Senate (Queensland) in the 2016 Australian federal election.

Critical recognition
 Medal of the Order of Australia OAM
 United Nations Queensland Award 
 Current National President of the Australian Association of Psychologists
 Accredited Compassion Fatigue Educator, Green Cross International Academy of Traumatology

Publications
 Stevenson, Paul. 2008. Best Practice for Human Services. Southport: Access Psychology.
 Stevenson, Paul. 2006. Are We There Yet? A Brief Strategy for Planning and Evaluation for the Human Services. Southport: Access Psychology.
 Stevenson, Paul. 2006. Postcards from Ground Zero. Burleigh: Zeus Publications.

References

External links
 Interview on ABC Radio, 28 September 2011
 Interview on ABC Radio on psychological impact of Qld public service sackings, 11 September 2012
 Interview on ABC Radio on the Bali Bombings, 17 October 2012

1955 births
Australian psychologists
Australian whistleblowers
Living people
People from Brisbane
Recipients of the Medal of the Order of Australia
University of Queensland alumni